Chalarodon madagascariensis is a species of Malagasy terrestrial iguanian lizard native to western, southern, and south eastern Madagascar. Until 2015, it was thought to be the only member of its genus, but a second species, C. steinkampi was recognised in 2015. It is not yet clear if the distributional range of these two species overlaps.

Habitat
The species inhabits mainly coastal, semi-arid to arid regions and almost entirely open, or very sparsely vegetated habitats with sandy soil in the province of Toliara, and in the southwestern provinces of Fianarantsoa and Majunga in the southwest of Madagascar.

Distribution
This species is widespread in western, southern, and eastern Madagascar.

Morphology
Calarodon madagascariensis is most easily distinguished from C. steinkampi by its keeled gular and ventral scales, which are unkeeled in the latter species. Total length is up to 223mm, usually about 200mm.

Nutrition
The Madagascar sand lizards are insectivores. In addition to insects, sometimes plants are ingested, particularly in the form of leaves and roots.

References 

Chalarodon
Endemic fauna of Madagascar
Reptiles of Madagascar
Lizards of Africa
Taxa named by Wilhelm Peters
Reptiles described in 1854